Big River Township is an inactive township in St. Francois County, in the U.S. state of Missouri.

Big River Township was erected in 1863, taking its name from the Big River.

References

Townships in Missouri
Townships in St. Francois County, Missouri